The 1985 World Figure Skating Championships were held at the Yoyogi National Gymnasium in Tokyo, Japan from March 3 to 10. At the event, sanctioned by the International Skating Union, medals were awarded in men's singles, ladies' singles, pair skating, and ice dancing.

Medal tables

Medalists

Medals by country

Results

Men

Ladies

Pairs

Referee:
 Elemér Terták 

Assistant Referee:
 Donald H. Gilchrist 

Judges:
 Eugen Romminger 
 Ingrid Linke 
 Sergei Kononykhin 
 Frances Dafoe 
 Dagmar Řeháková 
 Shirly Taylor 
 Hugh C. Graham Jr. 
 Klára Kozári 
 Jürg Badraun 

Substitute judge:
 Thérèse Maisel

Ice dancing

References

External links
 Result list provided by the ISU
 Ladies' placements per Skating Magazine April 1985
 skatabase

World Figure Skating Championships
World Figure Skating Championships
World Figure Skating Championships
World Figure Skating Championships
International figure skating competitions hosted by Japan
World Figure Skating Championships
Sports competitions in Tokyo